Gurusala Krishnadas Venkatesh (21 September 1927 – 17 November 1993) was an Indian film score composer who primarily worked in Kannada cinema during the 1960s, 1970s and until the late-1980s. He also composed music for Telugu, Malayalam and Tamil films. He produced numerous master pieces of Kannada film music and also brought in Western background score into Kannada films and scored music for all Bond movies of Rajkumar in the 1960s to 1970s.

Early life
Born in a Telugu family, Venkatesh began to learn music very young and was talented. Even as a child, he was appreciated by Ramakrishna Ranga Rao of Bobbili. He learned veena from his elder brother G. K. S. Pathi. As a teenager, he played Veena for the great music directors such as S. V. Venkatraman, S. M. Subbaiah Naidu and C. R. Subburaman.

GKV was also a talented singer. Before entering to cinema, he was singing in the Bangalore All India Radio. He had done chorus under S. V. Venkatraman for Meera.

Career

He became a close friend to M. S. Viswanathan (MSV) while working under S. M. Subbaiah Naidu during the late-1940s. They shared the same room in Jupiter Lodge, Madras when MSV was offered to compose some songs for Genoa. When N. S. Krishnan offered an opportunity to M. S. Viswanathan and T. K. Ramamoorthy to compose music for Panam (1952) for Madras Pictures, GKV became a part of their troupe. He had a chance to sing Ezhayin Kovilai Naadinaen in Panam which was also Sivaji Ganesan's second film. He was named as their assistant by Viswanathan–Ramamoorthy.

In 1952, he composed music independently for a Malayalam film, which was also dubbed in Tamil as Nadigai. In 1955, he started to compose music for a Kannada film named Sodari starring Rajkumar (his second film) and Pandaribai along with H. R. Padmanabha Shastry. Since then he became a much sought after and one of the successful music directors in Kannada films along with T. G. Lingappa and Vijaya Bhaskar. He was showered with offers where he composed music from Ohileshwara (1955) until Kalitaaroo Henne (1963) in a row. GKV launched P. B. Sreenivas as a successful singer in Kannada films.

He came back to Tamil films in 1964 for Thirumagal Films movie Magale Un Samathu. Since then he began to compose music for both Kannada and Tamil films.

In the late-1960s, it is notable that Ilaiyaraja and L. Vaidyanathan were playing instruments under GKV's troupe, assisting to compose music.

Work with Rajkumar

GKV composed music for 51 films in which Dr. Rajkumar played the lead role. He launched Dr. Rajkumar as a singer in the film Ohileshwara  (song: Sharanu Shambho) and also recorded Dr.Rajkumar's first duet in Mahishasura Mardhini (song: Tumbitu Manava with S. Janaki).
GKV would insist Dr. Rajkumar to sing regularly, owing to his grooming in the Gubbi Company. Rajkumar, however preferred P. B. Sreenivas, to sing for him.

In 1974, P. B. Sreenivas was unwell on the day of recording of song "Yare Koogadali" in the movie Sampathige Saval.GKV proposed Rajkumar to sing the song   and Rajkumar reluctantly recorded the song. Once PBS came back, they wanted to re-record the song, but PBS, being generous minded, suggested they keep the song as-is, because Rajkumar had done a phenomenal job.Thus it marked the re-emergence of the singer in Rajkumar.

A versatile music director, GKV used elaborate Western-style orchestration in his songs, be they of any genre. He successfully brought Master singer Dr. Bhimsen Joshi to sing for films Sandhyaraga (1966). Bhimsen Joshi sang again in the movie Nodi Swamy Navirodu Hige (1983).

Ustad Bismillah Khan was reluctant to play Shehnai for films during his later part of years. GKV got the Maestro to play Shehnai for lead character Appanna, enacted by Dr.Rajkumar in Sanadi Appanna (1977). The songs became chartbusters and are aired regularly on the Kannada Radio.

Style of composing
GKV was a technical wizard and one of the finest composer in India, He brought in the western background score first into Kannada cinema, His re-recording played a vital role in each and every movie he did, his use of instruments in his songs and background scores still feels fresh and advanced even today.

Works with Ilaiyaraaja
Ilaiyaraaja was hired as an assistant by GKV, an event that marked the entry of Ilaiyaraaja into film music composition and direction. Ilaiyaraaja assisted GKV in 200 Kannada film projects. Later Ilaiyaraaja went on to become one of the most prominent film music composers in India.

Acting

GKV had a small part to play in AVM Productions's  Mella Thirandhathu Kadhavu in 1986 in which he acted in the role of Mohan's musician father. His dialogues were dubbed by V. Gopalakrishnan. The music directors were M. S. Viswanathan and Ilaiyaraja.

He had appeared on-screen in the Kannada movie Kanteredu Nodu in 1961 in the song "Kannadada Makkalella Ondagi Banni", composed and sung by himself.

Film producer

During the fledgling days of Kannada film movement, he produced movies such as Ranadheera Kantheerava (1960), Immadi Pulikeshi (1968) in partnership with other artists. In 1987, he produced the Ramarajan and Revathi starrer Gramathu Minnal Tamil film.

Works
Prominent compositions of G. K. Venkatesh in Kannada include:
 "Kannadati taaye baa" from Sandhya Raga by Bhimsen Joshi
 "Nambide ninna naadadevateye" from Sandhya Raga sung in three different versions (Hindustani and Carnatic) by Bhimsen Joshi, M. Balamuralikrishna and S. Janaki respectively.
 "Aaha Mysuru Mallige" from Bangarada Manushya by P. B. Sreenivas and P.Susheela
 "Aadisi nodu, beelisi nodu" from Kasturi Nivasa by P. B. Sreenivas
 "Aadisidaata besara moodi" from Kasturi Nivasa by G. K. Venkatesh himself.
 "Elli Mareyaade" from Bhakta Kumbara by P. B. Sreenivos
 "Preetine aa dyaavru tanda aasti namma baalige" from Doorada Betta by P. B. Sreenivas & P.Susheela
 "Kannadada makkalella ondaagi banni" from Kantheredu Nodu by himself
 "Ravivarmana kunchaa kale" from Sose Tanda Soubhagya by P. B. Sreenivas and S. Janaki
 "If you come today, it's too early" from "Operation Diamond Racket" by Rajkumar
 "Baalu belakaayitu.." from Haalu Jenu by Rajkumar
 "Ninade nenapu dinavu manadalli.." from Raja Nanna Raja by P. B. Sreenivas
 "Naariya seere kadda, radheya manava gedda.." from Daari Tappida Maga by Rajkumar
 "Karedaroo kelade" and "Ninagaagi ododi bande" from Sanaadi Appanna by S. Janaki and Rajkumar with Bismillah Khan on the Shehanai.
 Harikesanallur Muthiah Bhagavatar's Kannada composition in the raaga Mohanakalyani "Bhuvaneshwariya nene maanasave" in Mareyada Haadu by S. Janaki.
 "Bhagyada lakshmi baaramma" in Nodi Swamy Navirodu Hige by Bhimsen Joshi
 "Gelati baaradu intha samaya" in Eradu Nakshatragalu by Rajkumar

Some compositions of G. K. Venkatesh in Tamil, include:
"Unga Manasu Oru Dhinusu" from Magale Un Samathu by K. Jamuna Rani
"Vaa Vaa Vaa En Thalaiva" from Naanum Manithan Thaan by T. A. Mothi & S. Janaki
"Kaatru Varum Kaalamondru" from Naanum Manithan Thaan by P. B. Sreenivas & S. Janaki
"Poonthendral Isaipaada" from Thaayin Karunai by P. B. Sreenivas
"Netru Nadanthathu" from Thaayin Karunai by A. L. Ragavan & S. Janaki
"Thoduvathenna Thendralo Malargalo" from Sabatham by S. P. Balasubrahmanyam
"Then Sindhudhe Vaanam"from Ponukku Thanga Manasu by S. P. Balasubrahmanyam & S. Janaki
"Naan Paartha Rathidevi Enge" from Kannil Theriyum Kathaigal by A. L. Raghavan
"Maasi Maadham Muhurtha Neram Medai Mangalam" from Pennin Vaazhkkai by Jayachandran & P. Suseela
"Azhagiya Sennira Vaanam" from Kashmir Kadhali by S. P. Balasubrahmanyam & S. Janaki
"Azhagiya Malarkkodi Pazhagiya Manikkili" from Inaindha Kodugal by K. J. Yesudas & Vani Jairam

Some compositions of G. K. Venkatesh in Telugu include:
"Paadana Tenugu Paata Ne Paravasamai Mee Eduta Ee Paata" from America Ammayi by P. Susheela
"Raasanu Premalekhalenno Daachanu Aashalenno Neelo" from Sridevi by S. P. Balasubrahmanyam & S. Janaki
"Ravi Varmake Andani Oke Oka Andanivo" from Ravanude Ramudaite by S. P. Balasubrahmanyam

Filmography

Music direction

Playback singer

See also
Rajan–Nagendra
Upendra Kumar
Cinema of Karnataka

References

 Masreo G.K.Venkatesh

External links
 GKV. tfmpage.com.
 Masreo G.K.Venkatesh

Music directors
1927 births
1993 deaths
Kannada film score composers
Film musicians from Andhra Pradesh
Tamil film score composers
Telugu film score composers
Tamil musicians
Telugu playback singers
Tamil playback singers
Tamil singers
20th-century Indian singers
20th-century Indian composers
Indian male playback singers
Musicians from Hyderabad, India
Male film score composers
20th-century Indian male singers